Bäch railway station is a railway station in the Swiss canton of Schwyz and municipality of Freienbach. The station is located on the Lake Zurich left-bank railway line. It is an intermediate stop on Zurich S-Bahn service S8, between Zurich and Pfaffikon SZ.

References

External links 
 

Bach
Bach
Freienbach